is a railway station on the Kashii Line operated by JR Kyushu in Higashi-ku, Fukuoka, Fukuoka Prefecture, Japan.

Lines

Station layout 
The station, which is unstaffed, consists of a side platform serving a single track in a cutting under street level with high rise buildings around it. The station building is at street level and spans the cutting. It houses a small waiting area and  automatic ticket vending machines. A flight of steps leads down to the platform. A designated parking area for bikes is provided outside the station.

Adjacent stations

History
The station was opened by JR Kyushu on 1 March 1994 as an additional station on the existing track of the Kashii Line.

On 14 March 2015, the station became a remotely managed "Smart Support Station". Under this scheme, although the station became unstaffed, passengers using the automatic ticket vending machines or ticket gates could receive assistance via intercom from staff at a central support centre.

Passenger statistics
In fiscal 2016, the station was used by an average of 1,082 passengers daily (boarding passengers only), and it ranked 153rd among the busiest stations of JR Kyushu.

References

External links
Maimatsubara (JR Kyushu)

Railway stations in Fukuoka Prefecture
Railway stations in Japan opened in 1994